The wing-snapping cisticola (Cisticola ayresii), also known as Ayres' cisticola,  is a species of bird in the family Cisticolidae. Its scientific name honours South African ornithologist Thomas Ayres.

Distribution and habitat
It is found throughout central and southern Africa.  Its natural habitats are subtropical or tropical dry lowland grassland and subtropical or tropical high-altitude grassland.

References

External links
 Wing-snapping cisticola - Species text in The Atlas of Southern African Birds.

wing-snapping cisticola
Birds of Sub-Saharan Africa
wing-snapping cisticola
Taxonomy articles created by Polbot